TracFone Wireless, Inc. (TFWI) is an American prepaid, no-contract mobile phone provider. TFWI is a subsidiary of Verizon Communications, and offers products and services under several brands. It operates as a mobile virtual network operator (MVNO), holding agreements with the three largest United States wireless network operators to provide service: AT&T Mobility, T-Mobile US, and Verizon. 

In 2021, Verizon acquired TracFone Wireless, Inc. from Mexico-based América Móvil (owner of Claro) in a deal worth up to $6.9 billion, involving 20 million subscribers. The deal was approved by the Federal Communications Commission on November 22, 2021, and closed the following day.

History 
TracFone Wireless, Inc. was established in 1996 as Topp Telecom Inc., a prepaid mobile phone company, in Miami, Florida. It was founded by David Topp and F.J. Pollak. Pollak acted as the CEO of Tracfone until his death in 2016.  In February 1999, Topp received a major infusion of capital from Teléfonos de México, a.k.a. TelMex, Mexico's largest telephone company. TelMex paid $57.5 million for a 55 percent controlling interest in the company.  

In 2000, TelMex spun off their mobile unit, creating América Móvil, of which Topp Telecom became a subsidiary. In November 2000, Topp Telecom Inc. changed its name to TracFone Wireless Inc.

In 2012, América Móvil acquired rival network Simple Mobile.

In May 2013, América Móvil purchased Page Plus Cellular, which had 1.4 million subscribers. On January 6, 2014, regulatory approval was received and Page Plus Cellular began operating as a subsidiary of América Móvil.

LTE service was inaugurated by TracFone's brands over a year and a half, with Sprint networks handsets first supporting it in May 2013, followed by AT&T four months later in September, then T-Mobile in March 2014. Verizon's TracFone headsets began to be supported in December 2014.

Originally, TracFone service was limited to TracFone-branded phones, which are locked to the TracFone service using an internal SIM card. Other GSM phones, even those that were unlocked from another carrier, could not accept a TracFone SIM card, because these are bound to a specific handset. In 2013, TracFone began to open up its device pool with a 'bring your own device' program, selling SIM cards that could be inserted into qualifying non-TracFone phones (such as Verizon CDMA phones) to connect with the TracFone network. In 2015, the program was expanded to unlocked and compatible GSM handsets.

On September 14, 2020, Verizon Wireless announced its intent to acquire TracFone in a cash-and-stock deal worth up to $6.9 billion. The deal closed on November 23, 2021. The acquisition will likely wind down the agreements to use the AT&T and T-Mobile GSM networks in favor of the Verizon LTE network (as the slower last-generation CDMA network for Verizon is being wound down itself), and as of September 2022, Straight Talk has transitioned to Verizon SIMs and Verizon-compatible phones, along with encouragements to replace TracFone GSM handsets.

Legal issues

Roaming and repair issues 
On February 9, 2007, a preliminary settlement in a class-action lawsuit against TracFone was carried out by Jeanette Wagner, and approved in the Boone County Circuit Court in Kentucky. The complainants alleged that TracFone misled consumers by charging a roaming rate in their home calling area (they were charged for 2 units per minute, not the usual 1 unit per minute), and that it refused to extend their prepaid service time during handset repairs. As a result of the settlement, Tracfone gave each of their customers an extra 20 units of airtime.

Misleading "unlimited" plan claims 
In January 2015, the Federal Trade Commission started a class action lawsuit naming TracFone and its affiliates, saying that the company cut off or slowed down "unlimited" data to its customers after they reached a fixed 30-day limit. TracFone was being sued over lying to their consumers about "unlimited" data. This led to $40 million in consumer refunds as a result.

References

External links 
 
 TracFone.com

Articles needing additional references from June 2017
Companies based in Miami
Mobile phone companies of the United States
Telecommunications companies established in 1996
Retail companies established in 1996
American companies established in 1996
1996 establishments in Florida
Mobile virtual network operators
América Móvil
2021 mergers and acquisitions